Mario Zorzan (15 February 1912 – 28 January 1973) was an Italian professional footballer, who played as a goalkeeper.

Club career
Throughout his club career, Zorzan played for Italian sides Vicenza, Milan, and Abbiategrasso. With 176 appearances for Milan, he is the club's ninth-most capped keeper of all time, behind only Christian Abbiati (380), Sebastiano Rossi (330), Dida (302), Lorenzo Buffon (300), Enrico Albertosi (233), Dario Compiani (221), Fabio Cudicini (183), and Giovanni Rossetti (180).

References

External links 
Profile at MagliaRossonera.it 

1912 births
1973 deaths
Italian footballers
Association football goalkeepers
Serie A players
L.R. Vicenza players
A.C. Milan players
Sportspeople from Vicenza
Footballers from Veneto